Alev Korun is a Turkish-Austrian politician. Korun was the first Turkish congresswoman in the Austrian Parliament (Greens).

In parliament, Korun has been serving as a member of the Committee on Human Rights and on the Committee on Internal Affairs since 2008. In 2013, she also joined the Committee on Foreign Affairs since 2013. She was a member of parliament till fall 2017, when the Greens lost all of their seats in the National Council.

In addition to her role in parliament, Korun has been serving as member of the Austrian delegation to the Parliamentary Assembly of the Council of Europe since 2012. As member of the Green Party, she is part of the Socialist Group. She currently serves on the Committee on Culture, Science, Education and Media and on the Sub-Committee on Refugee and Migrant Children and Young People. In 2017, she was part of the mission of observers from the 47-member Council of Europe to monitor the constitutional referendum that handed new powers to Turkish President Recep Tayyip Erdoğan.

References

External links

 Alev Korun auf den Seiten der Wiener Grünen

1977 births
Austrian people of Turkish descent
Living people